Yorkville High School, or YHS, is a public high school located in Yorkville, Illinois, a western suburb of Chicago, in the United States. It serves grades 9-12 for the Yorkville Community Unit School District 115.

The school serves Yorkville, Bristol, Montgomery, Oswego, and Plano.

History
In 2008, the Yorkville High School Academy opened across the street from the high school. It serves as a Freshman campus, while the high school remains for grades 10th through 12th.

Athletics
The Yorkville Foxes compete in the Southwest Prairie Conference. The school colors are red and white. The following Illinois High School Association (IHSA) sanctioned sports are offered:

Baseball (boys) 
Basketball (girls and boys) 
Bowling (girls and boys) 
Competitive Cheerleading (girls) 
Cross country (girls and boys) 
Girls state champion - 2011, 2012, 2013, 2014, 2015
Boys state champion - 2013, 2014
Football (boys)
Golf (girls and boys) 
Dance Squad (girls) 
Soccer (girls and boys) 
Softball (girls)
Swimming (girls and boys) 
Tennis (girls and boys) 
Track (girls and boys) 
Volleyball (girls) 
Wrestling (boys)
State champion - 1976, 1993, 1994

Yorkville formerly competed in the Northern Illinois Big 12 Conference, Western Sun Conference, The Little Seven Conference, and the Suburban Prairie Conference.

Notable people 
 Jon Blackman - Tight End/Left Tackle who played in the NFL and defunct XFL, class of 1993
 Dennis "Denny" Hastert - Former U.S. representative and speaker of the House, taught and coached at the school
 Mike Radja - Professional ice hockey player, class of 2003
 Andy Richter - Comedian, actor and writer, class of 1984
  - Journalists in Hong Kong, senior anchor and feature group reporter of TVB News.

References

External links
 Official website

Public high schools in Illinois
Educational institutions established in 1893
Yorkville, Illinois
Oswego, Illinois
Plano, Illinois
Schools in Kendall County, Illinois
Education in Kane County, Illinois
1893 establishments in Illinois